Stéphane Dumas (born 1978) is a French basketball player.

Stéphane Dumas may also refer to:

Stéphane Dumas (astrophysicist) (1970–2016), Canadian astrophysicist